The Pratt & Whitney R-2180-E Twin Wasp E was a radial aircraft engine developed in the United States by Pratt & Whitney. It had two rows of seven cylinders each. Its only production application was on the post-World War II Saab 90 Scandia airliner.

Design and development

The R-2180-E is effectively a fourteen-cylinder simplification of the twenty-eight cylinder R-4360 Wasp Major engine; its cylinders are the same size and displacement as those of the Wasp Major.

The R-2180-E Twin Wasp E was available in a "power-egg" installation certificated in 1945 for use as an engine upgrade for the Douglas DC-4.

Applications
 Piasecki XH/YH-16 Transporter
 Saab 90 Scandia

Specifications (R-2180-E1)

See also

References

External links
 Aerofiles Reciprocating Engines page
 

Aircraft air-cooled radial piston engines
R-2180
1930s aircraft piston engines